Goffredo Stabellini (born 8 July 1925 in Formignana, died 23 November 2012) was an Italian professional football player.

He played for one season (1946/47, 4 games) in the Serie A for A.S. Roma.

References 

1925 births
2012 deaths
Italian footballers
Serie A players
A.S. Roma players
Parma Calcio 1913 players
U.S. Lecce players
Taranto F.C. 1927 players
Vis Pesaro dal 1898 players
Association football midfielders